The Minnesota Senate, District 5, centers on the cities of Grand Rapids and Walker. It is currently represented by Republican Justin Eichorn.

List of senators

References 

Minnesota Senate districts
Itasca County, Minnesota